Warea may refer to:
Warea (plant), a genus of plants
Warea, New Zealand, a community in the west of Taranaki, New Zealand